David Crawley may refer to:

 David Crawley (footballer) (born 1977), Gaelic football and association football player
 David Crawley (bishop) (born 1937), Canadian bishop
 David Crawley (professor) (born 1954), University of Houston College of Technology